de Lissa is a surname literally meaning "of Lissa".  Notable people with this surname include:

Alfred de Lissa (1838–1913), English-born Australian solicitor
Emile de Lissa (1871–1955), Australian-born rugby union official
Lillian Daphne de Lissa (1885–1967), early childhood educator in Adelaide, South Australia
Benjamin Cohen de Lissa, Queensland sugar grower and investor in the failed Port Darwin Sugar Company at Delissaville, Northern Territory